Thomas Sowerby Rowlandson MC (22 February 1880 – 15 September 1916) was an English amateur footballer who played in the Football League for Sunderland and Newcastle United as a goalkeeper. He represented the England amateur national team.

Career 
Rowlandson signed for Newcastle from Sunderland in October 1905, expecting to secure a permanent place in the team and more regular appearances. He would only make a single league appearance for Newcastle in October 1905, where they beat Nottingham Forest 3–2.

Personal life 
Rowlandson attended Charterhouse School and Trinity College was a Cambridge University blue. After the breakout of the First World War in August 1914, he gave over his farmhouse for use as a hospital supply depot. Rowlandson subsequently enlisted in the British Army in Northallerton and was commissioned as a lieutenant in the Yorkshire Regiment on 5 September 1914. By 17 April 1915, he was on the Western Front, fighting in the Second Battle of Ypres. By 1 January 1916, he had been promoted to captain, mentioned in dispatches and won the Military Cross. Rowlandson was killed after being hit in the shoulder by a German grenade on 15 September 1916, during the Battle of Flers–Courcelette. He was buried at Bécourt Military Cemetery.

Career statistics

Honours 
Corinthian
 Sheriff of London Charity Shield: 1904

References

1880 births
1916 deaths
Footballers from North Yorkshire
English footballers
English Football League players
Association football goalkeepers
Cambridge University A.F.C. players
Corinthian F.C. players
British Army personnel of World War I
Military personnel from Yorkshire
Yorkshire Regiment officers
British military personnel killed in the Battle of the Somme
Preston North End F.C. players
England amateur international footballers
Sunderland A.F.C. players
Newcastle United F.C. players
Old Carthusians F.C. players
Darlington F.C. players
Recipients of the Military Cross
People educated at Charterhouse School
Alumni of Trinity College, Cambridge
Deaths by hand grenade
20th-century English farmers